Grothe is a surname that may refer to:
D. J. Grothe (born 1973), American writer, public speaker and President of the James Randi Educational Foundation
Eric Grothe Jr. (born 1980), Australian former rugby league footballer
Eric Grothe Sr. (born 1960), Australian former rugby league footballer, father of Eric Grothe Jr.
Luma Grothe (born 1993/94), Brazilian fashion model
Matt Grothe (born 1986), American former football quarterback